The history of the Jews in Panama can be traced back to the 1500s, when the first Crypto-Jewish Sephardi immigrants began to arrive from Spain and Portugal. The current Jewish population of Panama is around 20,000 and is centered in Panama City. Small but growing, Panama has the largest Jewish population in Central America. Well-integrated into Panama's social and political life, Panama is the only country other than Israel to have had two Jewish presidents during the 20th century: Max Delvalle Maduro in April 1967 and Eric Arturo Delvalle Cohen-Henriquez from 1985 to 1988.

History
The organized Jewish community in Panama has existed since the 1820s.

During the 1990s, around 7,000 Jews lived in Panama, including around 1,000 Israelis. By 2014, the Jewish population was between 12,000 to 14,000.

Kosher food
The majority of Panamanian Jews keep kosher or keep a kosher kitchen at home. Panama City has several dozen establishments offering kosher food, including restaurants, markets, bakeries, and catering services. Super Kosher is a 1,500 square meter kosher supermarket in Panama City that sells almost 10,000 kosher products. Importing kosher products from Europe, the US, Israel, and elsewhere, it is the largest kosher market in the world outside of Israel.

Notable Panamanian Jews
Abner Benaim, a film director, producer, screenwriter and plastic artist.
Morris Fidanque de Castro, Governor of the United States Virgin Islands.
Eric Arturo Delvalle, President of Panama from 28 September 1985 until 26 February 1988.
Max Delvalle, vice president from 1964 to 1968 and briefly served as acting president in 1967.
Eugene Eisenmann, a lawyer and amateur ornithologist.
Zion Levy, the Sephardic Chief Rabbi of Panama for 57 years, the longest tenure of any religious leader in the region.

References

External links

Chabad Panama

Ashkenazi Jewish culture in North America
Israeli diaspora in North America
 
Portuguese diaspora in North America
Portuguese-Jewish diaspora
Sephardi Jewish culture in North America
Spanish and Portuguese Jews
Spanish diaspora in North America
Spanish-Jewish diaspora